Jaworzyna Śląska  (German: Königszelt) is a town in Świdnica County, Lower Silesian Voivodeship, in south-western Poland. It is the seat of the administrative district (gmina) called Gmina Jaworzyna Śląska. It is an important railroad junction, located along the major line from Wrocław to Wałbrzych. In Jaworzyna, this line crosses with less important connections to Strzegom and Kamieniec Ząbkowicki. The town is located within the historic region of Lower Silesia.

In 2019, the town had a population of 5,124.

A large porcelain factory is the town's largest employer.

The Museum of Railway in Silesia (Muzeum Kolejnictwa na Śląsku) is located in Jaworzyna Śląska.

Notable people
Tadeusz Mytnik (born 1949), Polish cyclist, 1975 Tour de Pologne winner
Gustav Schubert (1916–1945), Luftwaffe pilot

Twin towns – sister cities
See twin towns of Gmina Jaworzyna Śląska.

References

Cities and towns in Lower Silesian Voivodeship
Świdnica County
Cities in Silesia